The St Leger is an original classic greyhound competition.

Race history

It was run at Wembley Stadium from 1928 until 1998 but when the Wembley Greyhounds ended it moved to Wimbledon Stadium in 1999. The race is considered to be the premier stayers (between 500 and 700 metres) competition in greyhound racing.

The competition came to an end at Wimbledon after the 2016 running before being switched to GRA sister track Perry Barr. The prize money has reduced in recent times due to financial issues in 2010 and the loss of a Sky TV contract more recently. However, Premier Greyhound Racing doubled the winner's prize money to £20,000 in 2022.

Past winners

Venues and Distances
1927–1974 (Wembley Stadium, 700 y) 
1975–1998 (Wembley Stadium, 655 m)
1999–2002 (Wimbledon Stadium, 660 m)
2003–2009 (Wimbledon Stadium, 698 m)
2010–2016 (Wimbledon Stadium, 687 m)
2017–present (Perry Barr Stadium, 710 m)

Sponsors
1994–1994 Wendy Fair
2005–2017 William Hill
2018–2018 (GRA)
2019–2020 Racing Post Greyhound TV
2021–2021 Arena Racing Company
2022–2022 Premier Greyhound Racing

References

Greyhound racing competitions in the United Kingdom
Recurring sporting events established in 1928
Sport in Birmingham, West Midlands
Sports competitions in Birmingham, West Midlands
Events at Wembley Stadium
Sport in the London Borough of Brent
Greyhound racing in London